"Cumbayá" is the first single from Pee Wee debut studio album Yo Soy released on May 26, 2009, released worldwide on June 1, 2009 and released on June 30, 2009 on iTunes, the song was produced under Mas Flow Inc by the producers Luny Tunes. The song was included on the album from soundtrack of telenovela Camaleones of the same name.

Background 
About the meaning of the name of the song, he said: "Cumbaya in the 30s... for those who were slaves was God almighty, was that being to which they prayed to ward off the bad times".

Music video 
 
The music video was directed by Carlos Pérez and filmed on a desert of Los Angeles, Cal. Through the video, Pee Wee fights against temptation until he finally surrenders, the concept of the video is show a boy who is going crazy because of a girl who he fell in love with.
The music video was premiered on Primer Impacto, Univision on June 23, 2009.

Track listing
 Digital download
 "Cumbayá" (single version) – 3:36

 Digital download – Cumbia
 "Cumbayá" (Cumbia version) – 3:39

Versions 
 Cumbayá (album version) - 3:33
 Cumbayá (single version) - 3:36
 Cumbayá (remix) (featuring Arcangel) - 3:31
 Cumbayá (Cumbia version) - 3:39

Charts

References

External links
Pee Wee official site
"Cumbayá" Music Video at YouTube

Pee Wee (singer) songs
Songs written by Pee Wee (singer)
2009 debut singles
Songs written by Noriega (producer)
Song recordings produced by Luny Tunes
2009 songs
Songs written by Francisco Saldaña